Labour service was required of "political unreliable" and Hungarian-Jewish men in Hungary during World War II after they were prohibited from serving in the regular armed forces by passage of the Hungarian anti-Jewish laws. In Hungary, Jews comprised over eight percent of the population, and the government imposed an alternative to military service. Labour service was forced labour, performed by labour battalions conscripted by the German-allied Hungarian regime primarily from Hungarian Jewish men during World War II.  These units were an outgrowth of World War I units, when Jews served in the Hungarian armed forces along with Christians, as in Germany and other European countries. The commanders of these labour battalions often treated the Jewish units with extreme cruelty, abuse, and brutality. Men who worked in mine quarries were frequently pushed to their deaths off the man-made cliffs and embankments.  These units were stationed all over Hungary, including 130,000 men at the Eastern Front in occupied Ukraine, where most of the men died. The gendarmes and Army men who guarded these "slaves" were mostly members of the anti-Semitic, fascist Arrow Cross Party.

The badly fed and poorly clothed units were initially assigned to perform heavy construction work within Hungary. With Germany's invasion on Soviet Union, Hungary officials sent most of these units into  Ukraine for additional forced labour work. They were subjected to atrocities, such as marching into mine fields to clear the area so that the regular troops could advance, and death by torture of prominent servicemen. Some units were entirely wiped out; others had as few as 5% of their members survive the war. However, these are more exceptions than a rule.  Generally speaking, a member of the labour service units had got more chance to survive the war than a fighting unit. Until 15th of October, 1944. the loss of the labour service units was: 41 340 person (27,5-34,4%). But 40%-of this lost had happened in one month: January of 1943, in the  Voronezh–Kharkov strategic offensive. The all retreating Hungarian Second Army was destroyed (only 20% arrived back to Hungary), with the labour force units also. 

A correspondence between the State Security Center and the Minister of Defense from 1942 (recovered in the Hungarian War Archive - Hadtörténelmi Levéltár) contributes to the still very scarce historical evidence that during World War II homosexuals were also targets of state control in Hungary. The correspondence contemplates whether or not to use homosexuals as forced labour within the wartime Labour Service System and has attached a list of altogether 993 alleged homosexuals. The phrase ‘officially registered homosexuals’ is used in the correspondence, supporting the supposition that the list was based on police registry. 

The famous poet Miklós Radnóti and writer Antal Szerb died during labour service. Ordinary people, such as Miklos Farkas born in Turcz in 1909, in the Northern Transylvanian county of Szatmár, were among the few survivors of their units. His unit was last based in Siegendorf, Austria, having previously been detailed to a stone quarry for most of the war. At Siegendorf, as the war came to an end, the guns of the advancing Soviet forces could be heard by the Nyilas (Hungarian Arrow Cross troops who guarded the Jewish slaves.) They decided to march most of the men out of the camp.

Suspecting an attempt to murder them before the Soviets could liberate the prisoners, Farkas and a few other men scattered underneath the barracks while they heard their friends being marched away. A short time later, they heard volleys of gunshots not too far away. Several hours later, in the night, they emerged from hiding and moved eastward towards the Hungarian-Austrian border where they met Soviet forces. Most of the young Jewish men had typhus and had to be hospitalized for several weeks until they recovered, then took one-way train trips home. Miklos went home most of the way as a stowaway on top of a train car to the small city of Halmin, now called Halmeu in Northern Romania.

References

 Randolph L. Braham, The Hungarian Labor Service System: 1939-1945 (Eastern European Monographs, 1977)
 Randolph L. Braham, The Politics of Genocide: The Holocaust in Hungary (Columbia Univ. Press, 1981, rev. ed. Eastern European Monographs, 1994)
 Establishing Labour service in Hungary (in Hungarian)
 Ungváry Krisztián: A munkaszolgálat embertelen, de túlzó mozgó vesztőhelynek nevezni

Further reading
 George F. Eber, Pinball Games: Arts of Survival in the Nazi and Communist Eras], Trafford Publishing, 2010. Written and illustrated by Eber before his death in 1995, the memoir was published by his estate; it tells of his experience in a Hungarian labour brigade and later escape to the West. Eber was conscripted into a "white-armband" brigade, consisting of "Christian-Jews," that is, men raised in a Christian tradition, but considered Jewish by the Nuremberg Laws.
 Andrew Fodor (Thomas C. Fodor, ed.), "The Survivor's Song: Unarmed Soldiers - Budapest to Stalingrad and back (Volume 1)", . 

Military units and formations of Hungary in World War II
Unfree labor during World War II
The Holocaust in Hungary